At the 1987 Central African Games, the athletics events were held at the Stade de la Revolution in Brazzaville, Republic of the Congo from 18–30 April.

A total of 36 track and field events (21 for men, 15 for women) were contested – two more than the previous edition as a men's decathlon and a women's 10,000 metres were held for the first time. Cameroon topped the medal table for the third time consecutively, with eleven gold medals among a haul of 27 overall. Burundi won the next most gold medals, with seven, while the host nation Congo had the second highest medal total at 22. In a closely contested affair, nine of the eleven competing nations reached the medal table and six of those reached double digits.

No athlete or relay team managed to achieve three consecutive victories in an event, and only three athletes returned and retained their titles from the 1981 edition: Cameroon's Jean-Pierre Abossolo-Ze topped the men's 400 metres hurdles for the second time, Angola's António Réais won his second men's hammer throw title, and Rwandan Marcianne Mukamurenzi was again women's 1500 metres champion. Ten games records were set during the competition, with highlights including Mukamurenzi knocking nearly ten seconds off the 1500 m record and Jeanne-Nicole Ngo Minyemeck adding nearly five metres to the women's discus throw record.

Five athletes won multiple individual titles at the games. Among the men, the host nation's Henri Ndinga claimed the 100 metres and 200 metres (repeating the feat of his countryman Théophile Nkounkou in 1981) and Pierre Ndongo of Cameroon won the shot put and discus titles. On the women's side, Gisèle Ongollo won the 100 m and 200 m, as well as the 4 × 100 metres relay title, for Gabon, Christine Bakombo of Zaire claimed a 400 metres/800 metres double, and Marcianne Mukamurenzi topped the podium for Rwanda in both the 1500 m and 10,000 m.

Medal summary

Men

Women

Medal table

References

Results
Central African Games. GBR Athletics. Retrieved 2019-09-14.

1987
1987
1987 Central African Games
Central African Games
1987 Central African Games